Shock Waves is a 1977 American horror film written and directed by Ken Wiederhorn. The film is about a group of tourists who encounter aquatic Nazi zombies when they become shipwrecked. It stars Peter Cushing as a former SS commander, Brooke Adams as a tourist, and John Carradine as the captain of the tourists' boat.

Plot
The film opens as Rose is found drifting alone in a small rowboat. Two fishermen find it and pull her onto their own boat, barely alive and in a horrible state. Her voiceover indicates she had been rescued from some terrifying experience and the film's events are flashbacks of it.

Young and pretty, Rose is part of a group of tourists on a small de recreo boat run by a crusty old captain and his handsome mate, Keith. Also on board are Dobbs, who is the boat's cook; Chuck, another tourist; and a bickering married couple named Norman and Beverly. After trouble with the engine, the navigation system goes haywire when they encounter a strange orange haze. The others sense that something is wrong. Norman in particular becomes abrasive. In the darkness of night, a hulking cargo ship suddenly appears and sideswipes their boat. The Captain sends up a flare, which momentarily lights up the eerie sight of a huge, rotting vessel wrecked nearby.

The next morning, everyone wakes to find the Captain missing. Realizing the boat is slowly taking on water, everyone evacuates in the lifeboat and makes for a nearby island. They see the huge wreck in the light of day; she appears to have been there for decades, nothing more than a skeletal framework, and now seemingly immobile, stranded on the island's reef. The group is startled to find the body of the Captain, apparently drowned while he was trying to check the underside of the boat for damage. They explore the island and discover a large, rundown hotel. At first they think it is deserted, but they discover a reclusive old man living there.

The man seems alarmed by their story, saying there is no shipwreck on the island and seems to recognize the name they say was the one they saw on the ship, and he goes down to the beach to personally investigate. Under the water, strange zombie-like men gather, walking from the wreck along the ocean floor to the island. As Dobbs gathers items to help prepare food, the zombies corner him in the water and one of them attacks; before it kills him, Dobbs falls in a cluster of sea urchins and is horribly mangled. Rose discovers his body while swimming. As they pull the body to shore, Keith finds a piece of torn uniform bearing the insignia of the Nazi SS in his hand. Back inside the hotel, their reluctant host tells them that he was a Nazi commander in charge of the "Death Corps", a group of zombies designed to be unstoppable super-soldiers that could thrive in any environment, with his group specialized for aquatic operations. The creatures were intended to be a powerful weapon for the Nazis, but they proved too difficult to control, with incidents involving them attacking their own soldiers. When Germany lost the war, he sank their ship and went into exile on the island. With the ship having raised herself from the ocean floor to the reef, he says the zombies have returned and that they are doomed. The Commander goes down to the beach again and sees a few of the zombies off in the distance. He tries to order them to stop, but they refuse to obey. He tries to chase them, but they end up drowning him.

The others locate a boat that the Commander told them about and pilot it out through the streams to the open water. They lose control of the boat, and it sails away from them, empty. A zombie drowns Norman in a stream, and another chases Rose back to the hotel, where she kills it by pulling off its goggles. Chuck, Beverly, and Keith return to the hotel, and they barricade themselves in the refrigerator unit. The close quarters and stress cause the survivors to begin infighting, and Chuck accidentally fires a flare gun, blinding Beverly. Keith and Rose escape to an old furnace room, where they hide inside two metal grates, while Beverly hides in a closet.  The zombies drown Chuck in a swimming pool outside.

The next morning, Keith and Rose discover Beverly dead, drowned in a large fish tank. Now on their own, they try to escape in a small sightseeing rowboat with a glass bottom. The zombies attack, and although Keith manages to defeat one by pulling off its goggles, a second one grabs him and drowns him just as the dinghy breaches the reef and drifts free. Rose sees Keith's lifeless body pressed up against the glass bottom of the boat and screams.

The film comes full circle, and Rose's voiceover returns. She is now in a hospital bed, seemingly writing in a journal. Her dialogue begins to repeat itself over and over, and she is revealed to be writing nonsense in her journal, showing that she has gone insane. The film ends with one last shot of the rotting ship, still stranded on the reef.

Cast

 Peter Cushing as SS Commander
 John Carradine as Captain Ben Morris
 Brooke Adams as Rose
 Fred Buch as Chuck
 Jack Davidson as Norman
 Luke Halpin as Keith
 D. J. Sidney as Beverly
 Don Stout as Dobbs

Production
Prior to making Shock Waves, producer Reuben Trane and director Ken Wiederhorn were students at Columbia University in New York City where they won the 1973 Academy Award for Best Dramatic Student Film. Their next work was filming Shock Waves as their first commercial feature film. Principal photography on the film began in July 1975, shooting in 16mm, which was later blown up to 35mm.

An issue of Cinemagic magazine shows and details the film being shot under the title Death Corps in Miami and West Palm Beach, Florida, in 1975 with a budget of $150,000. The swamp scenes in the film were shot near Miami's Crandon Park. It was later noted in the  Los Angeles Times in 1978, that the filmmakers raised $200,000 to complete the film.

According to a 2013 interview, Wiederhorn and Trane made Shock Waves because the investors had one requirement: they wanted a horror movie, because, according to Wiederhorn, "they heard that horror movies have a better chance of making their money back than any other genre". Wiederhorn and Trane then "started spitballing ideas. What’s scary? Since we were going to be filming in Florida, we thought: water can be scary. Then I came across this book called The Morning of the Magicians, which lays out a theory that the Third Reich was heavily into magic, so we thought: Nazi's  always work! So my first movie became a horror movie because the people who put up the money wanted a horror movie."

Release
Shock Waves was shown in Los Angeles on 21 September 1977. The film was released in the United Kingdom as Almost Human.

Home media
In the 1980s, Shock Waves was released on VHS by Prism Entertainment, and later by Starmaker. 

A special edition DVD of the film was issued by Blue Underground in 2003. The DVD was sourced from a print in Wiederhorn's personal collection, as the original negative was believed to be lost.

Blue Underground released the movie on Blu-ray, and held some theatrical showings of the feature as well, in November 2014.

In addition to standalone releases, the film was included in the three-DVD box set Superstars of Horror: Volume 1: Peter Cushing (Umbrella Entertainment, 2005).

Reception
From contemporary reviews, Tom Milne of the Monthly Film Bulletin commented that the zombie Nazis looked "agreeably sinister when they first emerge from the bottom of the sea with dripping hair, hideously scarred faces and uniform dark glasses", but the film's "inadequate budget is all too evident [...] both script and direction are also much too ready to settle for simple repetitions: a sizeable chunk of the footage is devoted to assorted characters stumbling through swampy shallows out of which, naturally, zombies emerge with sinister intent."

From retrospective reviews, Mike Long of DVD Talk rated the film 3 out of 5 stars, writing, "Horror fans looking for a zombie gorefest will be quite disappointed by Shock Waves, but those who want a subtle and unique experience may enjoy this quirky low-budget film." Oktay Ege Kozak, also writing at DVD Talk, rated it 1 out of 5 stars, declaring, "Shock Waves is a cheap, uninteresting, and entirely too forgettable genre effort from the 70s, a decade that otherwise revitalized horror cinema." 

Patrick Bromley of DVD Verdict commented, "More concerned with atmosphere than with shocks, it avoids a number of what would become the cliches of the genre; the flip side of that coin is that it delivers little of what we want from a zombie film." Patrick Naugle, also writing at DVD Verdict, said the movie is repetitious and boring. 

Writing in Horror Movies of the 1970s, critic John Kenneth Muir stated that despite Shock Waves being a "low budget exploitation film with a ludicrous B-movie premise", Wiederhorn nevertheless makes it work. Peter Dendle, who wrote The Zombie Movie Encyclopedia, said, "Shock Waves offers an undeniably creative and innovative approach to the screen presentation of the zombie, at the height of the post-Night decade in which such innovation was most lacking."

See also
 List of zombie Nazi films

References

External links

 
 
 
 

1977 films
1977 horror films
American zombie films
Films directed by Ken Wiederhorn
Films scored by Richard Einhorn
Films set in abandoned houses
Films set in Coral Gables, Florida
Films set in the Caribbean
Films set on islands
Nazi zombie films
1977 directorial debut films
1970s English-language films
1970s American films